GZT may refer to:
 Gazit-Globe, an Israeli real estate company
 Ghazipur Ghat railway station, in Uttar Pradesh, India
 Grévy's Zebra Trust, active in Ethiopia and Kenya
 Oğuzeli Airport, in Gaziantep, Turkey